Trimeresurus labialis, commonly called Nicobar bamboo pit viper, is a venomous pit viper species endemic to the Nicobar Islands of India. No subspecies are currently recognized.

Geographic range
Found only in the Nicobar Islands of India. The type locality given is "den Nikobaren".

Description
Males may attain a total length of 42 cm (16½ in), with a tail 8 cm (3⅛ in) long; females, total length 44 cm (17¼ in), tail 7 cm (2¾ in).

Dorsally, T. labialis is brown, either light or dark, with or without darker spots or transverse bars. It may have a light streak on each side of the head, beginning at the snout, continuing under the eye, to the neck.  Ventrally, it is also brown.

The dorsal scales are smooth, and are usually in 23 rows at midbody. Ventrals: 158-170 in males; 154-174 in females. Subcaudals: 60-65 in males; 46-57 in females. The subcaudals are usually double, but there may be some interspersed singles.

References

Further reading

Das I (1999). "Biogeography of the amphibians and reptiles of the Andaman and Nicobar Islands, India". pp. 43–77. In: Ota H (editor) (1999). Tropical Island Herpetofauna ... Amsterdam: Elsevier. 353 pp. .
Steindachner, F (1867). "Reptilien ". pp. 1–98. In: von Wüllerstorf-Urbair B (1867) ["1869" on title page]. Reise der Österreichischen Fregatte Novara um die Erde in den Jahren 1857, 1858, 1859 unter den Befehlen des Commodore B. von Wüllerstorf-Urbair (Zoologie), [Vol. 1, part 3]. Vienna: K. Gerold's Sohn/Kaiserlich-Königl. Hof- und Staatsdruckerei. (Trimeresurus labialis, new species, p. 86 + Plate III, figures 1 & 2) (in German). 
Stoliczka F (1870). "Observations on some Indian and Malayan Amphibia and Reptilia". Ann. Mag. Nat. Hist., Fourth Series 6: 105-109. (Trimeresurus mutabilis, new species, p. 108).

External links

Reptiles described in 1867
Endemic fauna of the Nicobar Islands
Reptiles of India
labialis
Taxa named by Franz Steindachner